is a Japanese footballer who plays as a midfielder for  club Kashiwa Reysol.

Career
Kota Yamada joined J1 League club Yokohama F. Marinos in 2017.

Career statistics
.

References

External links
Profile at Yokohama F. Marinos

1999 births
Living people
Association football people from Kanagawa Prefecture
Japanese footballers
Japan youth international footballers
Association football midfielders
Yokohama F. Marinos players
Nagoya Grampus players
Mito HollyHock players
Montedio Yamagata players
Kashiwa Reysol players
J1 League players
J2 League players